Jesus of Nazareth is a 1977 British-Italian epic film and television drama serial directed by Franco Zeffirelli and co-written by Zeffirelli, Anthony Burgess, and Suso Cecchi d'Amico which dramatizes the birth, life, ministry, crucifixion and resurrection of Jesus. It stars Robert Powell as Jesus, and features an all-star cast of actors, including eight who had won or would go on to win Academy Awards: Anne Bancroft, Ernest Borgnine, Laurence Olivier, Christopher Plummer, Anthony Quinn, Rod Steiger, James Earl Jones, and Peter Ustinov.

Some scenes were added in the writing of the screenplay, with some characters (such as Zerah) added to the film for brevity or dramatic effect. Jesus of Nazareth depicts Judas Iscariot as a well-intentioned man initially, but later as a dupe of Zerah's who betrays Jesus largely as a result of Zerah's false platitudes and pretexts. However, in accordance with the Gospels, the film depicts Nicodemus and Joseph of Arimathea as sympathetic members of the Sanhedrin. Many of the miracles of Jesus, such as the changing of water into wine at the wedding at Cana, the transfiguration, and the calming of the storm, are not depicted, although Jesus's healing of Jairus's daughter, the blind man and the crippled woman on the Sabbath, the feeding of the multitude, and the raising of Lazarus from the dead are presented here.

Jesus of Nazareth premiered on 27 March 1977, on the Italian channel Rai 1, and was first aired in the United Kingdom, on 3 April 1977, on the ITV Network. It became a ratings success and received highly positive reviews. Particular praise is often given for Robert Powell's portrayal of Jesus.

Plot summary
The storyline of Jesus of Nazareth is a cinematic Gospel harmony, blending the narratives of all four New Testament accounts. It presents Jesus as both God and man. During the baptism of Jesus in the River Jordan, John speaks God's words "this is my beloved son." The familiar Christian episodes are presented chronologically: the betrothal, and later marriage, of Mary and Joseph; the Annunciation; the Visitation; the circumcision of John the Baptist; the Nativity of Jesus; the visit of the Magi; the circumcision of Jesus; the Census of Quirinius; the flight into Egypt and Massacre of the Innocents; the Finding in the Temple; the Baptism of Jesus.

Gospel accounts in the movie also include the woman caught in adultery; the healing of Jairus' daughter; Jesus helping Peter catch the fish; the Parable of the Prodigal Son; a dialogue between Jesus and Barabbas (non-Biblical); Matthew's dinner party; the Sermon on the Mount; debating with Joseph of Arimathea; the curing of the blind man at the pool; the Raising of Lazarus (John 11:43); the Feeding of the Five Thousand; the entry into Jerusalem; Jesus and the money changers; the Parable of the Two Sons; healing the centurion's servant; dialogue with Nicodemus; the Last Supper; the
betrayal of Jesus by Judas.

At the Sanhedrin trial of Jesus, Jesus is accused of blasphemy for calling himself the son of the God of Israel. Caiaphas announces "the LORD our God, the LORD is one", denying the God of Israel has a son. The ensuing scenes include Peter's denying Christ and repenting of it; the judgment of Jesus by Pilate ("Ecce Homo"); the Johannine Passion Narrative (John 18–19; including the Agony in the Garden); the Carrying of the Cross; the Crucifixion of Christ (Laurence Olivier's Nicodemus recites the "Suffering Servant" passage (Isaiah 53:3-5) as he looks helplessly on the crucified Messiah); the discovery of the empty tomb; and an appearance of the Risen Christ to his Disciples. The film's storyline concludes with the non-Biblical character Zerah and his colleagues gazing despairingly into the empty tomb. Zerah laments, "Now it begins. It all begins".

Cast
Starring
 Robert Powell as Jesus
Guest Stars

 Anne Bancroft as Mary Magdalene
 Ernest Borgnine as the Roman Centurion
 Claudia Cardinale as the Adulteress
 Valentina Cortese as Herodias
 James Farentino as Peter
 James Earl Jones as Balthazar
 Stacy Keach as Barabbas
 Tony Lo Bianco as Quintillius
 James Mason as Joseph of Arimathea
 Ian McShane as Judas Iscariot
 Laurence Olivier as Nicodemus
 Donald Pleasence as Melchior
 Christopher Plummer as Herod Antipas
 Anthony Quinn as Caiaphas
 Fernando Rey as Gaspar
 Ralph Richardson as Simeon
 Rod Steiger as Pontius Pilate
 Peter Ustinov as Herod the Great
 Michael York as John the Baptist

And
 Olivia Hussey as Mary
Also Starring
 Cyril Cusack as Yehuda
 Ian Holm as Zerah
 Yorgo Voyagis as Joseph
With
 Ian Bannen as Amos
 Marina Berti as Elizabeth
 Regina Bianchi as Anne
 Maria Carta as Martha
 Lee Montague as Habbukuk
 Renato Rascel as The Blind Man
 Oliver Tobias as Joel
Co-Starring

 Norman Bowler as Saturninus
 Robert Beatty as Proculus
 John Phillips as Naso
 Ken Jones as Jotham
 Nancy Nevinson as Abigail
 Renato Terra as Abel
 Roy Holder as Enoch
 Jonathan Adams as Adam
 Lorenzo Monet as Jesus aged 12 years
 Robert Davey as Daniel
 Oliver Smith as Saul
 George Camiller as Hosias
 Murray Salem as Simon the Zealot
 Tony Vogel as Andrew
 Michael Cronin as Eliphaz
 Steve Gardner as Philip
 Derek Godfrey as Elihu
 Renato Montalbano as Jairus
 John Duttine as John
 Michael Haughey as Nahum
 Keith Skinner as Possessed Boy
 Cyril Shaps as Possessed Boy's Father
 Jonathan Muller as James, son of Zebedee
 John Tordoff as Malachi
 Isabel Mestres as Salome
 Bruce Lidington as Thomas
 Keith Washington as Matthew
 Mimmo Crao as Jude Thaddeus
 John Eastham as Bartholomew
 Sergio Nicolai as James, son of Alphaeus
 Francis de Wolff as Simon the Pharisee
 Antonello Campodifiori as Ircanus
 Paul Curran as Samuel
 Tim Pearce as Rufus
 Mark Eden as Quartus
 Bruno Barnabe as Ezra
 Simon MacCorkindale as Lucius
 Forbes Collins as Jonas
 Lionel Guyett as Haggai
 Martin Benson as Pharisee
 Peter Harlowe as Valerius
 Carl Forgione as Plotinus
 Donald Sumpter as Aram
 Pino Colizzi as Jobab
 Robert Brown as Pharisee
 Harold Bennett as Elder
 Robert Mallard as Quazra
 Abdelmajid Lakhal as the Farisaeum
 Christopher Reich as Circumcision Priest and as Metellus

Previous collaborations with Zeffirelli
Several cast members had already featured in previous Zeffirelli productions. British actors Olivia Hussey, Michael York, Roy Holder, Dyson Lovell and Keith Skinner had featured in Romeo and Juliet as Juliet, Tybalt, Peter, Sampson and Balthasar respectively. Additionally, Pino Colizzi who appeared as Jobab, had previously dubbed Michael York's Tybalt in the Italian version of Romeo and Juliet.

Production
The drama was conceived when Lew Grade was received by Pope Paul VI, who congratulated him on the making of Moses the Lawgiver (1974), a television film starring Burt Lancaster and which was produced by Grade's ITC Entertainment and the Italian television network RAI. At the end of the interview, the Pope told him he hoped his next project would be about the life of Jesus. Two weeks later, while dining with an RAI executive, Grade told him he intended their companies to prepare such a film. The role of director was offered to Franco Zeffirelli — a religious Roman Catholic who knew the Pontiff from his days as the Archbishop of Milan, when he often visited Zeffirelli's school — on the Pope's initiative, who insisted that either he would make Jesus of Nazareth or no one else. The director rejected the proposal at first, but Grade finally convinced him to agree; he accepted the job shortly before Christmas 1973.

Scriptwriter Anthony Burgess later recounted the launching of the project in an essay entitled "Telejesus (or Mediachrist)":The notion of making a six-hour television film on the life of Jesus Christ was proposed by an enobled British Jew, with the golden blessing of an American automobile corporation. The project struck some as blasphemous, others as ecumenical. Lord Grade, who was then Sir Lew Grade, presided over a massive press conference in the Holy City, (Rome), and said all that was available to be said — namely, that there would be this film, that Zeffirelli would direct it, and that Burgess would write it. Fired by this announcement, the Romans laid on a great, as it were, First Supper, which the Chief Rabbi of Rome attended, as well as various cricket-playing British ecclesiastics. Sir Lew Grade was made a Cavaliere of the Republic. The Pope was noticeably absent.

Both Grade and Zeffirelli insisted their adaptation of Jesus's life should be 'ecumenical', coherent, even to non-believers, and 'acceptable to all denominations'. To ensure the film's accuracy, the producers consulted experts from the Vatican, the Leo Baeck Rabbinical College of London, and the Koranic School at Meknes, Morocco. However, when Zeffirelli asked Rabbi Albert Friedlander to help him create Jesus's Bar Mitzvah scene, the latter replied that such ceremonies were practiced only from the 15th century. The director, however, insisted on including it, and Friedlander tried to teach child actor Lorenzo Monet to read a short portion of the Pentateuch in Hebrew. Monet, however, mumbled it and the director was not satisfied (in the film, boy Jesus reads mostly in English).

Principal photography was carried out in Morocco and Tunisia from September 1975 to May 1976. The synagogue scenes were shot with extras from the Jewish community in the island of Djerba. The city of Monastir in Tunisia served as 1st-century Jerusalem. Ernest Borgnine, who portrayed Cornelius the Centurion, recalled that since regulations required hiring local extras—most with poor English—for many of the smaller roles, they had to be dubbed. Zeffirelli decided to avoid recording sound altogether in many parts, and simply send the principal actors to dub their own characters in the studio later. The standing sets of the film were later used by the British comedy troupe Monty Python for their religious satire Life of Brian (1979).

There are various reports regarding the size of the drama's budget: Presbyterian Survey stated it was $12 million, The Listener cited the figure of £9 million (roughly $16 million), while Third Way stated it cost £11.5 million (roughly $20 million). Other sources give the sum of $18 million. In his autobiography, Lew Grade wrote that "in the final accounting, Jesus of Nazareth took $45 million."

Powell's portrayal of Jesus
The producers at first considered choosing a well-known star, who would draw a large audience, for the role of Christ. The first actor thought of was Dustin Hoffman, and Al Pacino was also a candidate.  Director Zeffirelli decided to look for an actor whom the audience would immediately identify as Jesus. For example, Hoffman and Pacino both stand at just 5'6", and neither man's face bears a resemblance to Jesus as depicted in art, which has been based for many centuries on the image found on The Shroud of Turin. The image on the shroud is that of a man who is six feet tall.  Eventually, the character's appearance in the series was influenced by Warner Sallman's portrait painting Head of Christ: Paul Harvey and Edward J. Blum wrote the show 'put Sallman's imagination in motion'. The Virgin Mary was depicted by Olivia Hussey.

The idea to cast Robert Powell originated with Lew Grade's wife, Kathie Moody, who told her husband the actor had 'wonderful blue eyes' after watching him perform in a BBC television adaptation of Jude the Obscure. Powell came under criticism from religious groups for 'living in sin' with his companion, dancer Barbara Lord of Pan's People, while intending to portray Jesus. The couple married shortly before production began. As of 2022, Powell and Lord have been married for 47 years.

Powell rarely blinks throughout the entire film, mimicking, in this respect, H.B. Warner in 1927's The King of Kings and Max von Sydow in 1965's The Greatest Story Ever Told. This effect was a deliberate decision by Franco Zeffirelli. James Houlden commented that the result was 'a penetrating, unrelenting eye contact with Jesus's. A dark blue eyeliner was applied on set to accentuate Powell's blue eyes. Powell's portrayal has since become an often-used image in popular devotional art, and 'defined the visual image of Christ in the minds of the audience... Perhaps more than any other Jesus film.'

For the crucifixion scene, Powell starved himself on a diet of only cheese for 12 days prior to shooting "in order to look worn".

Original broadcasts and reception
Jesus of Nazareth premiered on the Italian channel Rai 1 on 27 March 1977. It was broadcast in five episodes, one shown every week until 25 April. On Palm Sunday, 3 April 1977 – the date of the airing of the second episode – the Pope endorsed the programme in his public address for the holiday and recommended the faithful to view it. The series enjoyed high ratings: the German Dominican friar and film critic Ambros Eichenberger reported that according to local surveys, 84% of the television owners in the larger cities watched the series. For example, the number of viewers for the third episode, aired on 10 April, was estimated to have been 28.3 million.

In the United Kingdom and in the United States, it was broadcast in two parts, albeit in different lengths, by the ITV network in the UK and by NBC in the US. In both countries, the first part was aired on 3 April and the second on Easter, 10 April 1977. During its original showing in the UK, Jesus of Nazareth had an estimated audience of 21 million viewers.

When the first episode was broadcast in the US, it was a major success. The New York Times reported it "swamped all competing programs on Sunday night", with overnight Nielsen ratings of 53% in Los Angeles and 46% in New York City. The miniseries as a whole received a Nielsen rating of 30.8 points, with each point representing approximately 712,000 television-owning homes, and an audience share of 50% nationwide, on both nights. The company calculated that Jesus attracted about 90 million viewers.

In West Germany, it was broadcast by ZDF in four episodes on the 19th, 21st, 23rd and 24 March 1978; 40% of the audience have viewed it.

Jesus of Nazareth turned into a massive commercial success and is one of the most widely marketed, most critically acclaimed and best-known productions about Christ's life. Lew Grade stated that it made "a net profit of $30 million." Robert Powell's performance as Jesus in particular has been praised by critics.

Controversy
Before its initial broadcast, Jesus of Nazareth came under ideological fire from some American Protestant fundamentalists, led by Bob Jones III, president of Bob Jones University in South Carolina, and Dr. Bill Bright, because they felt the TV movie had to have the resurrection of Jesus Christ to be true to the Gospel account. Zeffirelli had told an interviewer from Modern Screen that the film would portray Jesus as "an ordinary man – gentle, fragile, simple". Jones interpreted this as meaning that the portrayal would deny Christ's divine nature. Having never seen the film, Jones denounced it as "blasphemy." Others picked up the cry and 18,000 letters were sent to General Motors, which had provided $3 million of the film's cost. Sacrificing its investment, GM backed out of its sponsorship. Procter and Gamble eventually took it over, buying the U.S. rights for a relatively low price of some $1 million. Their financial support allowed the mini-series to be screened after a simulated resurrection was added at the suggestion of Dr. Ted Baehr, a theologian and media pundit, who was friends with the producer, Vincenzo Labella, and acquainted with the protesters. The scenes showed the empty tomb, and then cuts to Jesus discussing his death and resurrection with his disciples.

Narrative deviations from the Gospels

Although the film has been received as generally faithful to the Gospel sources, and more comprehensive than previous film versions, Zeffirelli and his screenwriters found it necessary to take some liberties with the scriptures for purposes of brevity and narrative continuity. Some of these deviations have a basis in time-honoured, extra-Biblical traditions (e.g., that the infant Jesus was visited by three "kings"; the Bible calls them "magi" or "astrologers", yet does not state how many there were). Other deviations were invented for the script:
 Perhaps the greatest liberties taken in the screenplay are interpretations of the motivation of Judas Iscariot in betraying Jesus to the authorities prior to his arrest and execution. In contrast to the Gospels – which vilify Judas as a thief who stole from the Disciples’ money purse (John 12:6) and betrayed his Master simply for money (Luke 22:5) – the film portrays Judas as a much-misunderstood political person who, in several scenes, conspires with the Zealots for the sake of Jewish liberation in a way that could be interpreted as honourable, albeit misguided.
 The film introduces a number of entirely original characters. Of these, Ian Holm's Zerah, who is essentially the series "main villain", has the most screen time. Zerah is used primarily to supply Judas Iscariot with a motive for his treachery: he persuades him that an appearance before the Sanhedrin will offer Jesus an opportunity to prove himself. He is also used to create a main lead villain when Jesus personally confronts the temple priesthood, in particular during the cleansing of the Temple and the Gethsemane arrest scene. Other invented characters include Quintillius, Yehuda and Amos.
 In the Bible, the only mention of Jesus in childhood is his trip to the temple in Jerusalem as a 12-year-old. In the film, the boy Jesus is also portrayed at his bar mitzvah, which is interrupted by a raid of Roman soldiers plundering supplies. The portrayal of a Bar Mitzvah is anachronistic as the ceremony most likely did not exist at that time. It was deliberately included by Zeffirelli because a modern non-Jewish audience might not be aware of that obscure fact and would expect to see it, and he did not want to defy audience expectation. The boy Jesus is also portrayed as climbing a ladder and looking out over the landscape of Judea after Joseph makes the analogy of a ladder reaching to heaven.
 The prostitute and the woman who anoints Jesus's feet with ointment and her hair are combined into one person. The Bible indicates that Mary Magdalene (who is never actually said to be a prostitute) is the woman from whom seven demons were cast out, while the ointment-bearing woman is Mary of Bethany, a sister of Lazarus (John 11:2). Nevertheless, the identification of the three women is present in many Christian traditions and is not particular to the film.
 In the film, Nicodemus visits Jesus in the late afternoon, not at night as in John 3:3.
 The Apostle Andrew introduces Simon to Jesus as "My brother, Simon Peter." But "Peter" is the name that Jesus later gave to Simon (John 1:42, Matthew 16:18) after he was well acquainted with him, not his original given name. Later in the drama, Jesus does give Simon the name of "Peter".
 The Apostle Thomas, prior to his calling, is depicted as a servant of Jairus, the synagogue leader whose 12-year-old daughter Jesus raises from the dead. Nowhere in the three gospel accounts of this resurrection is Thomas the Apostle described as Jairus's servant. This was done in the movie to conveniently introduce Thomas as the doubter when Jesus said Jairus's dead daughter is "only sleeping."
 Barabbas is portrayed in the film as a Zealot (political extremist and agitator). The meeting and dialogue between Jesus and Barabbas are made up.
 The Parable of the Prodigal Son (Luke 15:11–32) is used as a plot device which simultaneously redeems the disciple Matthew and reconciles him to his bitter enemy, Simon Peter. Although not in the Bible, this has been praised as one of the film's particularly felicitous innovations. (The Gospels do not record either a conflict or a particular friendship between Matthew and Simon Peter.)
 In the film, Pontius Pilate, having convicted Jesus of treason, sentences him to be crucified. The Gospels record that Pilate acquitted Jesus but sentenced Him under pressure from the crowd. The film implies such pressure to convict was applied prior to the trial, by the Sanhedrin, but does not explicitly state it. The film also shifts Pilate washing his hands to the scene in which he is introduced, rather than during the trial itself.
 The film does not depict Pilate remanding Jesus's case to Herod Antipas and Antipas sending Jesus back to Pilate (Luke 23:6–12).
 The Gospels and the film both relate an account of a Roman centurion who petitions Jesus to heal his sick servant. The film, but not the Gospels, presents the same officer (portrayed by Ernest Borgnine) as one of the soldiers standing at the foot of the Cross, where he sympathetically allows Mary to approach her son.
 In the Bible Judas is paid 30 pieces of silver for betraying Jesus. Full of remorse, he later gives the silver back to the priests (Matthew 27:3–5). In the film, Judas is given silver coins as an afterthought by Zerah; he does not return them and they are shown lying on the ground under the tree from which he hangs himself.
 The film depicts a scene that shows Joseph dying. The Gospels never mention anything about Joseph after the story of Jesus, as a boy, in the Temple.
 The film depicts the Crown of Thorns being removed from Jesus's head during the crucifixion process. This removal is never mentioned in the Gospels, and goes against the usual depiction of Jesus continuing to wear it whilst on the cross.
 The healing of the blind beggar scene, where Jesus spat on dirt and rubbed the mud in the blind man's eyes, was set in the Temple; the whole of John 9 places this episode after Jesus had left the Temple and was "walking along."

Awards and nominations
Jesus of Nazareth received an Emmy Award nomination for Outstanding Special Drama. Additionally, James Farentino, who portrayed the apostle Peter, received a nomination for Outstanding Performance by a Supporting Actor in a Drama Special.

The drama was nominated for six British Academy Television Awards: Best Actor, Best Cameraman, Best Single Television Play, Best Editor, Best Costume Design and Best Sound. It won none.

Jesus of Nazareth won awards for Best Cinematography to Armando Nannuzzi, Best Costume Design to Lucia Mirisola and Best Production Design, to Mirisola again, from the Italian National Syndicate of Film Journalists.

Subsequent broadcasts and home media
NBC rebroadcast the series in 1979, 1980, 1984, 1987 and 1990.

It was originally released as a three-tape VHS edition in the early 1980s under the Magnetic Video label. It was released later under the mainstream video label of CBS/FOX in 1986. Another three-tape VHS edition was released by LIVE Home Video in 1992 and again on 22 February 1995. Artisan Entertainment released the DVD version on two discs in February 2000. In the UK, the original 1986 Polygram VHS (four tapes) was fully uncut and featured the full 386-minute version. The 2000 Carlton video (two tapes) featured a heavily abridged print running for 270 minutes. The Granada DVD is credited as the unedited print and runs for 374 minutes, but this is due to the PAL speed up and is the full version. The two additional scenes — a private meeting between Judas Iscariot and Zerah, and the opening betrayal sequence during the Last Supper — were actually added in the repeat UK screening 2 years later and therefore is not included as the DVD is the original 1977 cut.

The serial is broadcast every Easter and Christmas in many countries, including Greece on ANT1, and in the United States on History Channel and TBN.

In Chile, the full serial has been broadcast every Good Friday since 1982 by the public service television broadcaster Televisión Nacional de Chile.

The Region 1 DVD is the original 1977 broadcast. The Region 2 Carlton DVD released in the UK is substantially cut and runs to 270 minutes. The Dutch DVD release (also Carlton Region 2) has a running time of 365 minutes (the 399-minute running time stated on the cover is a misprint).

The drama has been released on digital download (or streaming) for both Google Play and the Apple Store. The version released is the completed original 4-part 1977 broadcast, though only in its original Standard Definition. Similar to other Christian content the film's copyright has only been loosely enforced in more recent years resulting in it also freely appearing on YouTube in its entirety.

For Easter 2016, and again in 2018, the UK's Sky Arts channel showed one part a day over the four days of Easter. The version they used was the extended four-part edition, totaling eight hours with advertising.

The serial ran on NBC as "The Big Event" in two three-hour installments with limited commercials on Palm Sunday and Easter Sunday. Additional footage was added for a 1979 re-run and broadcast in four two-hour installments. In the 1980s and 1990, the film was re-broadcast on NBC in three installments of two- and three-hour episodes, released on VHS and DVD as one complete presentation with one set of credits.

In 2022, the full series was made available on BritBox in the UK in time for Easter.

See also
 A.D.

References

Further reading
Barclay, William. Jesus of Nazareth (1977, Collins). .
Burgess, Anthony. Man of Nazareth (1979, McGraw-Hill). .
Zeffirelli, Franco. Franco Zeffirelli's Jesus: A Spiritual Diary (1984, Harper & Row). .

External links

webpages dedicated to the movie called "Jesus of Nazareth" by Franco Zeffirelli
Jesus of Nazareth at the Arts & Faith Top100 Spiritually Significant Films list

1970s British drama television series
1977 British television series debuts
1977 British television series endings
1977 Italian television series debuts
1977 Italian television series endings
Films about Jesus
1970s British television miniseries
Cultural depictions of John the Baptist
Cultural depictions of Judas Iscariot
Cultural depictions of Pontius Pilate
Depictions of Herod the Great on film
Films scored by Maurice Jarre
Films directed by Franco Zeffirelli
Films shot in Tunisia
Religious epic films
Italian television films
Portrayals of Jesus on television
Portrayals of the Virgin Mary in film
Portrayals of Saint Joseph in film
Films with screenplays by Suso Cecchi d'Amico
Television series based on the Bible
Television series by ITC Entertainment
Television series set in the Roman Empire
Portrayals of Mary Magdalene in film
Cultural depictions of Saint Peter
RAI original programming
Cultural depictions of Salome